Trancura River (also known as Pucón River or Minetúe River) is a river located in the La Araucanía Region of Chile. Its headwaters drain the southeasternmost portion of Villarrica National Park, including the northwestern slope of Lanín volcano. The river flows initially to the north and from its junction with its main tributary, the Maichín River, the Trancura turns in a westerly direction until emptying into the Villarrica Lake, after having received the waters of Caburgua Lake through Carrileufú River. This latter river emerges at the Ojos del Caburgua and is fed by the Liucura River, which further has as a tributary the outflow stream of Tinquilco Lake.

The town of Curarrehue is located near its confluence with the Maichín River.

The river is used for rafting by tourism companies in Pucón.

See also
List of rivers of Chile

References

Trancura
Rivers of Araucanía Region